The B4518 road is a road in Powys, central Wales, with a total length of .
. En route going north from Rhayader it passes through the following settlements: St Harmon, Pant-y-Dwr, Tylwch, Llanidloes (where it crosses the A470 again), Staylittle, Pont Crugnant, Pennant, Bont Dolgadfan, Llan and Plas Esgair. It passes through the Clywedog Valley and Clywedog Reservoir, built in 1964.

References

Roads in Wales
Transport in Powys